Piplod railway station is a railway station in Dahod district of Gujarat State of India. It is under Ratlam railway division of Western Railway Zone of Indian Railways. It is located on New Delhi–Mumbai main line of the Indian Railways. Passenger, MEMU and Express trains halt here.

Trains

Following trains halt at Piplod railway station in both directions:

 19019/20 Bandra Terminus - Dehradun Express
 12929/30 Valsad - Dahod Intercity Superfast Express
 19023/24 Mumbai Central - Firozpur Janata Express

References

Railway stations in Dahod district
Ratlam railway division